Loughrey is a surname. Notable people with the surname include:

Andrew Loughrey (1844–1913), New Zealand politician
Cale Loughrey (born 2001), Canadian soccer player
James Loughrey (born 1986), Irish Gaelic footballer
Jane Loughrey, Northern Irish journalist
Joachim Loughrey (born 1947), Irish politician
Johnny Loughrey (1945–2005), Northern Irish singer and songwriter 
Pat Loughrey (born 1955), Northern Irish media executive
Stuart Loughrey (born 1991), Irish field hockey player